Margarita Magaña (born Margarita Magaña Amillategui on 11 July 1980)  is a Mexican actress and model, best known for her roles in the Mexican television series Al diablo con los guapos, Un gancho al corazón, and Teresa.

Career 
Born in Mexico City, Margarita started her career at 15 years old in the telenovela Club de Gaby.  Later she attended the Centro de Capacitación Artística de Televisa (CEA) to prepare herself as an actress. Her soap opera debut was with Thalia in María la del barrio in 1995.

In the Mexican film La Primera Noche it was the debut of the actress in this sort, sharing credits with Osvaldo Benavides and Mariana Ávila. In 1999 she plays her first role of antagonist in the soap opera Por tu Amor. In 2001 she starred in the soap opera El Juego de la Vida with Valentino Lanús, Sara Maldonado, Ana Layevska and Jackie García.

Later in 2002 she appeared in the soap opera Las vías del amor as Alicia Betanzos. In 2004 she participated in the soap opera Amar otra vez where she played a villain named Brenda next to Irán Castillo. In 2006 she played Bertha Balmori in the soap opera La Verdad Oculta.

Filmography

Telenovelas, Series

Theatre

Awards and nominations

Premios TVyNovelas

References

External links

1979 births
Living people
Mexican child actresses
Mexican telenovela actresses
Mexican television actresses
Mexican film actresses
Mexican female models
20th-century Mexican actresses
21st-century Mexican actresses
Actresses from Mexico City
People from Mexico City
21st-century Mexican singers
21st-century Mexican women singers